Peter Rzehak (born 8 February 1970) is an Austrian former alpine skier.

References

1970 births
Living people
Austrian male alpine skiers